Marie Harriet Brenner (born December 15, 1949) is an American author, investigative journalist and writer-at-large for Vanity Fair. She has also written for New York, The New Yorker and the Boston Herald and has taught at Columbia University's Graduate School of Journalism. Her 1996 Vanity Fair article on tobacco insider Jeffrey Wigand, "The Man Who Knew Too Much", inspired the 1999 movie The Insider, starring Russell Crowe and Al Pacino. Her February 1997 Vanity Fair article "American Tragedy: The Ballad of Richard Jewell" partially inspired the 2019 film Richard Jewell directed by Clint Eastwood.

Career
Brenner earned a Bachelor of Fine Arts from the University of Texas at Austin and received a M.A. from New York University Film School. She was the first female baseball columnist covering the American League, traveling with the Boston Red Sox for the Boston Herald during the 1979 season. Brenner worked as a contributing editor for New York magazine from 1980 to 1984, and covered the royal wedding of Prince Charles and Lady Diana Spencer.

Brenner joined Vanity Fair as a special correspondent in 1984. She left the magazine in 1992 to become a staff writer at The New Yorker, returning to Vanity Fair in 1995 as writer-at-large. Her 1996 article for Vanity Fair on Jeffrey Wigand and the tobacco wars, titled "The Man Who Knew Too Much", was made into the 1999 feature film The Insider, starring Russell Crowe and Al Pacino, and directed by Michael Mann. It was nominated for seven Academy Awards, including Best Picture.

In 2012, Brenner penned a piece entitled "Marie Colvin's Private War", for Vanity Fair. This article was later adapted into the film A Private War, directed by first time director, Matthew Heineman, and starring Academy Award nominated actress, Rosamund Pike. Pike was nominated for Best Actress in a Motion Picture - Drama at the 76th Golden Globe Awards, while Heineman was recognized with a nomination from the Directors Guild of America with a nomination for Outstanding Directorial Achievement of a First-Time Feature Film Director.

In 1997, she wrote an article for Vanity Fair on Richard Jewell, the security guard hailed as a hero, then incorrectly suspected, of the Olympic Park bombing in 1996. Titled "American Tragedy: The Ballad of Richard Jewell", it was, along with the 2019 book The Suspect: An Olympic Bombing, the FBI, the Media, and Richard Jewell, the Man Caught in the Middle by Kent Alexander and Kevin Salwen, the basis of the 2019 film Richard Jewell.

Brenner's 2002 Vanity Fair article, "The Enron Wars," delving into the investigation into the Enron scandals, made national news when Senator Peter Fitzgerald used it to question witnesses testifying before a senate committee.

In 2009, the Manhattan Theater Club announced that it had commissioned Alfred Uhry to adapt Brenner's memoir Apples and Oranges: My Brother and Me, Lost and Found for the stage.

An archive of Brenner's work is stored at the Howard Gotlieb Archival Research Center at Boston University, but it is not open to researchers without permission of the estate, and the Gotlieb Center will not tell researchers how to contact the estate.

Incident with Donald Trump
During a black-tie gala at Tavern on the Green in 1991, Donald Trump poured a glass of wine down Brenner's suit because she had written an unflattering piece about him earlier that year.

Personal life
Brenner was born December 15, 1949 in San Antonio, Texas, to Milton Conrad Brenner and Thelma (Long) Brenner. She grew up in San Antonio and moved to New York City in 1970.

Her father was chairman of Solo Serve Corporation, a chain of Texas discount stores started by her grandfather Isidor Brenner. Isidor, born in 1872, was a Jewish emigrant to Texas from the Duchy of Kurland (in modern Latvia), in 1892. He married Paula, a Jewish emigrant from Riga, Latvia, by way of Chicago. The couple moved their family back and forth between Mexico and Texas during the first years of the Mexican Revolution, finally settling the family in San Antonio, in 1916.

She is the niece of Anita Brenner, anthropologist, author, and one of the first women to be a regular contributor to The New York Times. She had an older brother Carl, a lawyer turned apple farmer who was the focus of her memoir, Apples and Oranges: My Brother and Me, Lost and Found.

Bibliography
 The Desperate Hours: One Hospital's Fight to Save a City on the Pandemic's Front Lines, New York: Flatiron Books. 2022. ISBN 9781250805737.
 A Private War: Marie Colvin and Other Tales of Heroes, Scoundrels and Renegades, London: Simon & Schuster, UK Ltd. 2018. , 
 Apples and Oranges: My Brother and Me, Lost and Found, New York: Picador, 2008. , 
 Great Dames: What I Learned from Older Women, New York: Three Rivers Press, 2000. , 
 House of Dreams: The Collapse of an American Dynasty, London: Joseph, 1988. , 
 Intimate Distance, New York: William Morrow and Co., 1983. , 
 Going Hollywood: An Insider's Look at Power and Pretense in the Movie Business, New York: Delacorte Press, 1978. , 
 Tell Me Everything, New York: New American Library, 1976. ,

References

Further reading
Art at Our Doorstep: San Antonio Writers and Artists featuring Marie Brenner. Edited by Nan Cuba and Riley Robinson (Trinity University Press, 2008).

External links

Marie Brenner website

Michiko Kakutani review for The New York Times
Interview with Lesley Stahl for WowOWow.com

1949 births
Living people
American women writers
Columbia University faculty
Writers from San Antonio
University of Texas at Austin alumni
Tisch School of the Arts alumni
American women journalists